In 1996, the city of Seattle, Washington adopted a resolution to preserve shoreline street ends (sometimes referred to as SSEs) throughout the city as public rights-of-way, to allow improvements for public uses and access. This resolution gave a broad outline of considerations that would apply to public access improvements to shoreline street ends and to removing private encroachments and severely limiting future permits for private uses of street ends. Three years later, this was enhanced with a statement, "Fees for use of shoreline street ends may take into consideration City policy of discouraging encroachments inconsistent with the public right of access to shorelines and may be included in the schedule of fees for use of public places under the jurisdiction of Seattle Transportation."

Seattle borders Puget Sound (most notably Elliott Bay, the city's main port) and Lake Washington; the lower Duwamish River and its industrialized estuary known as the Duwamish Waterway flow through the city to Elliott Bay; the Lake Washington Ship Canal bisects the city and includes Lake Union ( in its own right); and there are numerous smaller lakes in the city, so many streets end in water. Since the adoption of this resolution, it has been city policy to preserve these numerous street ends for public access. Over the decades since, this has resulted not only in preserved public rights of way, but also in numerous new public parks.

As of 2016, seven of the 149 recognized sites (nine of them along the Duwamish Waterway) still lacked public access. 88 were designated in the city's fact sheet as "worth a visit," and 54 as "not yet ready for visitors." Nine sites, overlapping the last two categories, were in the design and development stage. "[N]early two-thirds" were described as being "in need of improvement, overgrown, or hav[ing] private encroachments."

History 
Upon becoming a state in 1889, Washington raised money by selling public tidelands. By the time the state decided in 1971 to suspend further such sales, only about 40% of tidelands remained under public ownership. In 1987, the state passed a law limiting vacations of streets abutting bodies of water. This law favors "Port, beach or water access, boat moorage, launching sites, park, public view, recreation, or education" as getting automatic precedence over other uses.

While by then Seattle had several parks adjacent to the water (e.g., Alki Beach Park, Golden Gardens Park, Seward Park), there were (and are) significant gaps. Community groups pushed to increase public shoreline access by improving street ends where public rights of way are platted into the water. As the Seattle Post-Intelligencer put it in 2007, "city maps showed roads drawn right into Lake Washington, Lake Union, Puget Sound, Shilshole Bay, Portage Bay, Elliott Bay and other Seattle waterways." In 1996, the city identified 149 such shoreline street ends and designated them for "public uses and enjoyment." A later ordinance established permit fees to discourage private uses of these lands, and directed the revenue from these fees toward the maintenance and improvement of shoreline street ends. The result has been the creation and maintenance of a wide variety of public spaces: beaches, docks in industrial areas, expansions of existing parks, some providing habitat for native species, others simply providing water views.

Public access to Seattle's waterfronts had not always been such a priority. One example can be found in the Eastlake neighborhood, where a longstanding foot and bicycle route along the east side of Lake Union was disrupted by a series of permits issued between 1957 and 1992, which allowed buildings and a marina to build into the historic right of way, to the point of completely preempting public passage along the shore from E. Edgar Street to E. Hamlin Street.

Not all of these transitions have been easy. When the program began, many of these street ends had been de facto integrated into neighbors' yards and business areas, with access limited by fences and hedges, and with people having placed gardens, children's swing sets, and even hot tubs; some business had annexed them for equipment storage. In the late 1990s, as Seattle was establishing regulations for shoreline street ends, the citywide group Friends of Street Ends formed to support the transition of these back to public use. Meanwhile, many people living near the designated SSEs objected to "noise, traffic and people wandering into their yards."

For example, in 2013, the owners of the two properties adjoining Northeast 130th Street Beach discovered that 82 years earlier the title to the land had not properly been conveyed to the City, and they proceeded to fence it off as part of their respective properties. Using the threat of eminent domain, the City reached a settlement with the owners and—after nearly seven years—regained control of the land.

List of official shoreline street ends 
The following list uses the official numbering used by the City of Seattle. The list of 149 official SSEs remains unchanged since their original designation in 1996. Statuses are based on Shoreline Street Ends factsheet (2016) with updates December 2022 from the City's official interactive map. Note that street names are not necessarily unique: many Seattle streets hit bodies of water more than once.

Other shoreline street ends 

Besides the 149 officially recognized shoreline street ends, there are numerous other places where waterfront public access is available at the end of a street in Seattle. Some of these, such as Lynn Street Mini Park in Eastlake on Lake Union, predate the ordinance. Others are designated as "waterways", open to the public based on longstanding boat access rights of way. Examples of this are Waterway No. 1, a former ferry landing at the foot of NE 35th Street in Laurelhurst on Union Bay and the elaborately landscaped Waterway 15 immediately west of Ivar's Salmon House at the foot of 4th Ave NE on the north shore of Lake Union/Portage Bay. Others remain in a bit of a limbo, such as Gateway Park North, the street end of 8th Avenue South in Georgetown on the northeast side of the Duwamish Waterway, open to the public but undeveloped, with jurisdictional issues still being sorted out.

Notes

External links 
 Interactive map showing Seattle's shoreline street ends
 Shoreline Public Access section of Washington State Department of Ecology Shoreline Master Programs handbook

Streets in Seattle
Tourist attractions in Seattle